This is a list of the European Space Agency's short and long duration expeditions to Mir and the International Space Station. The dates below each name indicate the period of stay aboard the station.

List

See also
List of Mir Expeditions
List of International Space Station expeditions
List of visiting expeditions to the International Space Station

References

Bibliography

Expeditions to the International Space Station
Space exploration
ESA